Coffee Crisp is a chocolate bar made in Canada. It consists of alternating layers of vanilla wafer and a foamed coffee-flavoured soft candy, covered with a milk chocolate outer layer. Originally launched by British company Rowntree's, it is currently owned and commercialized by Nestlé.

History 
The predecessor to the Coffee Crisp can be found in the United Kingdom in the 1930s, when Rowntree's launched the "Rowntree's Wafer Crisp". This bar was then introduced in Canada as "Biscrisp". In 1938, a coffee variation was added to the Biscrisp line, being named Coffee Crisp. In 1988, Nestlé acquired Rowntree's Canadian operations, including the Toronto chocolate factory where the bar is produced.

Other versions of the confection 
In 2001, the first variation of the Coffee Crisp brand was introduced, a limited-edition "Coffee Crisp Orange" flavour. A limited amount of the orange flavour was reissued in 2002. That same year, a limited-edition "Coffee Crisp Raspberry" flavour was released. "Coffee Crisp Café Caramel" was sold in the summer of 2004 and again in the summer of 2006. A limited-edition "Coffee Crisp White" was launched in the autumn that same year. A limited-edition maple-flavoured bar was available from April to September 2005.

For much of the 2000s, Coffee Crisp was available in "French Vanilla" and "Triple Mocha" flavours. In 2005, the coffee bean-shaped "Coffee Crisp Beans" were introduced. The most recent bar form was Coffee Crisp Yogurt.

In January 2007, all variations of Coffee Crisp bars other than the original were discontinued.

Coffee Crisp 70% dark chocolate was introduced in 2009. Sometime between 2008 and 2010, French Vanilla and Chocolatey Crunch variations were made available. In 2014, Coffee Crisp Latte was released in celebration of Coffee Crisp's 75th anniversary. In early 2021, a new Coffee Crisp Double Double flavour was released.

A Coffee Crisp-flavoured ice cream bar and ice cream flavour are also available.

Availability outside Canada 
Canadian expatriates have long lamented the bar's relative unavailability outside Canada.  Coffee Crisp is available in Australia at some specialised sweet shops, and unofficial exports of Coffee Crisp treats (originally labelled for the Canadian market) to the U.S. have also taken place, particularly in shops near the Canada–United States border.

There was a petition at coffeecrisp.org asking Nestlé to market the Coffee Crisp in all U.S. cities. According to the site, the petition succeeded, and Nestlé began marketing the Coffee Crisp nationwide in late July 2006.
In April 2009, the marketing of the Coffee Crisp bar into the U.S. was discontinued by Nestlé Canada.  In May 2009, Coffee Crisp was being exported into the U.S. market by British Wholesale Imports.

At the Canadian section of Epcot at Walt Disney World, there is a shop that sells Coffee Crisp bars.

In the southeastern United States, Coffee Crisp is available in Publix supermarkets.

In the north and southeastern United States, Coffee Crisp is available in Wegmans supermarkets. In the northeastern United States, the Stop 'n' Shop supermarket offer Coffee Crisp bars in the UK foods section.

See also 
 Crisp (chocolate bar)—different "Crisp" candy bars by Nestlé, sold in the United States

References

External links

 

1938 establishments in Canada
Chocolate bars
Nestlé brands
Products introduced in 1938
Canadian confectionery
Coffee dishes